St Paul's Catholic High School, also known as St Paul's RC High School, is a mixed Roman Catholic secondary school located in the Newall Green area of Manchester, England.

History

Former schools
St Augustine's Grammar School was a Catholic grammar school on Stancliffe Road, Sharston Mount in the north of Wythenshawe off the A560, which opened in 1966. It became the upper school of St John Plessington High School (comprehensive) in 1977. This became part of St Paul's RC High School in 1984, and the Sharston site became derelict in 1987, and demolished in 1988. Another Catholic grammar school in south Manchester is St Bede's College. St Columbia's and All Hallows secondary modern catholic schools in south Manchester closed in 1975 and 1994 with staff and pupils from All Hallows transferring to St John Plessington and ultimately St Paul's.

Admissions
Previously a voluntary aided school administered by Manchester City Council, St Paul's Catholic High School converted to academy status on 1 April 2013. The school is administered by the Roman Catholic Diocese of Shrewsbury but continues to coordinate with Manchester City Council for admissions.

The school was graded as 'inadequate' by Ofsted in 2015, highlighting 'serious weaknesses'. In 2022 the school was graded 'good' by Ofsted.

The school is situated west of the M56 (North Cheshire Motorway). To the west nearby is Newall Green High School which closed in 2021. The present site of St Paul's on Firbank Road incorporates the original premises of St Peter's RC Primary School, which swapped property with the original St Paul's next door. St Peter's Church adjacent to the site was demolished in 1990.

Curriculum
St Paul's Catholic High School offers GCSEs and BTECs as programmes of study for pupils. Graduating students often go on to attend Loreto College and Xaverian College for sixth form education.

Notable alumni

St Augustine's Grammar School
 Mark Lythgoe, British neurophysiologist
 Johnny Marr, main composer and guitarist of The Smiths
 Hughie O'Donoghue, painter
 Paul Power (footballer), left back for Manchester City
 Andy Rourke, bassist of The Smiths
 Gerry Sundquist, actor

St Paul's Secondary School 
 John Bradley (known as John West in St Pauls), actor known for portraying Sam Tarly in Game of Thrones
 Kevin Kennedy (known as Kevin Williams in St Pauls), actor known for portraying Curly Watts in Coronation Street

References

External links
 St Paul's Catholic High School official website
 Former previous grammar school

Secondary schools in Manchester
Catholic secondary schools in the Diocese of Shrewsbury
Academies in Manchester